Suicide Club, known in Japan as , is a 2001 Japanese independent horror film written and directed by Sion Sono. The film explores a wave of seemingly unconnected suicides that strikes Japan and the efforts of the police to determine the reasons behind the strange behavior.

Suicide Club gained considerable notoriety in film festivals around the world for its controversial, transgressive subject matter and overall gruesome presentation. It developed a significant cult following over the years, and won the Jury Prize for "Most Ground-Breaking Film" at the 2003 Fantasia Film Festival.  This film has a similar premise to M. Night Shymalan's The Happening.

Plot
The film takes place over six days, with footage from a fictional pop group "Dessert" opening and closing the film. The story begins with a concert held by Dessert, in which they perform a J-Pop song titled "Mail Me".

In Tokyo on May 27, 54 teenage schoolgirls commit mass suicide by throwing themselves in front of an oncoming train. Shortly after, at a hospital, two nurses commit suicide by jumping out of a window. At both locations, rolls of skin are found, with the skin in the rolls matching that removed from the bodies of the dead. Three detectives—Kuroda (Ryō Ishibashi), Shibusawa (Masatoshi Nagase), and Murata (Akaji Maro)—are notified by a hacker named Kiyoko (Yoko Kamon) of a link between the suicides and a website that shows the number of suicides as red and white circles.

On May 28, at a high school, a group of students jump off the roof during lunch, sending the city in search of a "Suicide Club". By May 29, the suicide boom has spread all over Japan. Mitsuko is on her way home when she gets hit by her boyfriend, Masa, who has thrown himself off a roof. Mitsuko is taken to the police station for questioning, where the police strip-search her and discover that she has a butterfly tattoo.

On May 30, the police receive a call from a boy who warns that on that evening at 7:30, another mass suicide will take place at the same platform. The detectives organize a stake-out in order to prevent the event but there is no suicide. Meanwhile, individual and smaller-scale group suicides continue all over Japan, claiming many lives, including Kuroda's entire family. Kuroda receives a call from the boy who had warned about the 7:30 suicide, and Kuroda shoots himself after.

Kiyoko is captured by a group led by a man named Genesis, whose hideout is a small subterranean bowling alley, where he resides with four glam-rock cohorts. During her capture, Genesis performs a song while a girl in a white sack is brutally raped and killed right in front of them. Kiyoko e-mails the authorities information about Genesis.  On May 31, the police arrest Genesis, and it is assumed the leader of the "Suicide Club" has been caught.

On June 1, Mitsuko goes to her boyfriend's home to return his helmet, where she notices pop group Dessert's posters on the wall and recognizes a pattern on the fingers of the group that corresponds to the letters on a telephone keypad spelling out the word "suicide". The boy from earlier calls to tell her there is no "Suicide Club" and invites her to a secret concert.

On June 2, Mitsuko sneaks into the backstage area and sees a group of children in the audience, who ask her questions. Mitsuko impresses the children so they take her to a room where a strip from her skin is shaved off; it is the spot where the butterfly tattoo was.

A new roll of skin ends up with the police, and detective Shibusawa recognizes the strip as the one with Mitsuko's tattoo. That evening, he sees Mitsuko at the train station and grabs her hand but she pulls away. She stares at Shibusawa as the train pulls into the station, and again after boarding the train. As the train pulls out, the ending credits begins, in which Dessert announces their disbandment and offer appreciation toward their fans' support, before performing their final song, "Live as You Please".

Cast

 Ryō Ishibashi as Detective Kuroda
 Masatoshi Nagase as Detective Shibusawa
 Akaji Maro as Detective Murata
 Saya Hagiwara as Mitsuko
 Yoko Kamon as Kiyoko/Kōmori-The Bat
 Rolly as Muneo "Genesis" Suzuki
 Hideo Sako as Detective Hagitani
 Takashi Nomura as Security Guard Jiro Suzuki
 Tamao Satō as Nurse Yoko Kawaguchi
 Mai Hōshō as Nurse Atsuko Sawada
 Kimiko Yo as Kiyomi Kuroda
 Mika Kikuchi as Sakura Kuroda
 So Matsumoto as Toru Kuroda

Critical reception
Jonathan Regehr of Screen Anarchy gave the film a rating of 6/10, calling it "an unbalanced movie". Dai Green of HorrorNews.net wrote that the film "may not register entirely in first run, but it will certainly leave a mark". Virginie Sélavy of Electric Sheep Magazine wrote that "Suicide Club has been described as 'muddled' and Sono criticised for not making his satire of pop culture and denunciation of the media clear enough. But the ambiguity of the film is precisely what makes it interesting".

Prequel
As of early 2006, the film has one prequel and a proposed follow-up. Noriko's Dinner Table (Noriko no Shokutaku) depicts events from before and after the happenings of Suicide Club and gives more insight on its predecessor. In 2006, Sono said "I always wanted to make a trilogy but in reality it is very difficult."

Print publications

Novel
Jisatsu Saakuru: Kanzenban (自殺サークル　完全版, translated as Suicide Circle: The Complete Edition) was written by Sion Sono in April 2002. The book deals with the themes of Suicide Club and Noriko's Dinner Table, bringing the two plots closer. So far no plans for an English edition have appeared.

Manga
A manga of the same title and written by Usamaru Furuya appeared at the same time of the movie's Japanese DVD release. Although Furuya's intention was to faithfully reproduce the film's plot, Sono asked him to write his own story. As a result, the Suicide Club manga is much more straightforward and easier to understand than the film, and features much more solid character development. It deals with the same opening scene, but there is a twist: out of the 54 suicidal girls, a survivor is reported: Saya Kota. Her best friend, Kyoko, must now unveil the secret of the Suicide Club and save Saya from falling deeper into it.

See also
Copycat suicide

References

External links
 
 
 
 

2001 films
2001 horror films
2001 independent films
2001 LGBT-related films
2001 psychological thriller films
Films about suicide
Films directed by Sion Sono
Films set in Tokyo
Films shot in Tokyo
2000s Japanese-language films
Japanese horror films
Japanese independent films
Japanese LGBT-related films
Japanese psychological thriller films
Lesbian-related films
Manga series
2000s Japanese films